The Wheatsheaf is a public house at 6 Stoney Street, Borough, Southwark, London.

It was rebuilt in 1840. The building was Grade II listed in 1998, it being noted that the interior was well preserved. 
The pub closed for four years beginning in 2009, during which the top storey was removed to make way for the Thameslink Programme viaduct. A competing Red Car Pubs venue opened nearby, but now uses the name "Sheaf".

The 2017 London Bridge attack also took place in the surrounding area, with people stabbed in the Wheatsheaf and other nearby pubs and restaurants, and with all three attackers, wearing what turned out to be fake explosive vests shot dead outside the Wheatsheaf by police marksmen at 10:16pm on Friday 3 June.

References

Grade II listed buildings in the London Borough of Southwark
Grade II listed pubs in London
Pubs in the London Borough of Southwark